Al-Fath Mosque is a mosque in the city of Cairo. Located in the Ramses Square, it is among the largest mosques and equips the tallest minaret in the city and the 3rd tallest in the world. During the post-coup unrest in Egypt, the  took place in the mosque on August 16, 2013, which resulted in the death and injury of several protesters and subsequent shut down of the mosque.

History
The mosque has its roots on the old mosque founded during the early Muslim conquests of Egypt. Today's Ramses Square was a village known as Um Dunin in the 7th century, in which the Islamic conquerors had established their center and the adjacent mosque as well. Later the mosque was expanded by the Fatimid Caliph Al-Hakim bi-Amr Allah and named as "Al-Maqs Mosque". According to the map of Al-Maqrizi, the name was a reference to the nearby castle  existed back then on the island at the Nile, known as Qal'at Al-Maqs. The mosque was also called as Jami Bab al-Bahr. It developed during the era of Al-Hakim in the site to provide the need for the mosque within the siege area, and returning the wealth to the ordinary people. During the Fatimid-era, there were numerous palm trees within the yard, and caliphs enjoyed the view of the mosque from the fleet on the Nile.

The mosque was also called as Awlad 'Anan Mosque, an ode to two brothers who were experts on tasawwuf during the era of the Mamluk sultan Tuman bay II, Muhammad and Abdul Qadir bin 'Anan. The elder brother Muhammad was buried in the site in 1499, who was said to be lived until 120 years old, and this gave the mosque the name of Awlad 'Anan.

However, this old mosque was destroyed by the French occupational forces along with several other mosques during the Revolt of Cairo in 1798. A military facility was built on top of the ruins named after a French officer.

Later, a new mosque was established on the same place by Arab Contractors, and inaugurated on February 22, 1990, by the former president of Egypt Hosni Mubarak during the celebration of Isra and Miraj. Newly founded mosque was named as "Al-Fath" which means "the conquest" in the Islamic context, and designed by the architect Hussein Bikri. The name Alwad 'Anan is also still being used.

Arab Spring
Two days after the August 2013 Rabaa massacre on August 14, 2013, supporters of Muhammad Morsi gathered together in the Ramses Square and the neighboring area of the mosque. When the police clashed with the demonstrators, some of them fled into the mosque and the place had eventually turned into a hospital for the injured. Next day morning, the police raided the mosque, and arrested the demonstrators before it was shut down.

See also
 Lists of mosques
 List of mosques in Africa
 List of mosques in Egypt

References

Mosques completed in 1990
Mosques in Cairo
Mosque buildings with domes
20th-century religious buildings and structures in Egypt